It was a Dacian fortified town.

Dacian fortresses